Bertie Lewis (born 24 August 1931) was the 13th  Dean  of St David's between 1990 and 1994.  He was born on 24 August  1931 and educated at St David's College, Lampeter and St Catherine's College, Oxford. He was ordained after a period of study at Wycliffe Hall, Oxford in 1958 and began his career with curacies at  Cwmaman and Aberystwyth St Michael. He held incumbencies at Llanddewibrefi, Henfynyw and Lampeter. From 1986 to 1990 he was Archdeacon of Cardigan, following which he entered the Deanery. His last post before retirement was as Vicar of Nevern.He died on  3 April 2006 aged 74, having suffered in his latter years from Parkinson's disease.

References

1931 births
Alumni of the University of Wales, Lampeter
Alumni of St Catherine's College, Oxford
Archdeacons of Cardigan
Welsh Anglicans
Deans of St Davids
2006 deaths